KraussMaffei is a German manufacturer of injection molding machines, machines for plastics extrusion technology, and reaction process machinery. It was acquired by ChemChina in 2016.

History

KraussMaffei was formed in 1931 from a merger of the two Munich firms of Maffei (founded 1838) and Krauss & Co. (founded 1860). Both belonged to the leading German makers of locomotives of various types. Maffei also built other steam-operated vehicles and, later, manufactured vehicles with combustion engines, including locomotives, trolleybuses and buses until the 1950s. The headquarters of the firm remained in Munich.

KrausMaffei had produced injection moulding equipment since 1957. In 1964 the company Eckert & Ziegler GmbH was taken over.

In the 1960s, KraussMaffei built several examples of the ML 4000 C′C′ diesel-hydraulic locomotive for demonstration and testing on American railroads. Southern Pacific and Denver & Rio Grande Western Railroad participated in the tests, but both found the locomotives unsuitable for service in the rugged Rocky Mountains through which the two railroads ran. 

KrausMaffei was a major tank manufacturer. In 1963 the company started production of the Leopard tank. Development and production of Leopard 2 tank started in 1972 in cooperation with Wegmann & Co. The "tank family" comprised not only main battle tanks, but also combat engineering vehicles, air defense tank Flakpanzer Gepard, self-propelled howitzer Panzerhaubitze 2000 (PzH 2000), and reconnaissance and transportation vehicles. More than 10,000 armoured vehicles based on Leopard tanks were produced since 1960s.

In the 1970s, KraussMaffei were involved in the development of the Transrapid magnetic levitation train. 

In 1986 the plastics equipment division was separated and became Krauss-Maffei Kunststofftechnik GmbH.

Mannesmann acquired majority share of KraussMaffei in 1989, and bought out the remaining shares in 1996.

In 1999 KraussMaffei merged with Demag to form the Mannesmann Demag Kraus-Maffei.

In 1999 the defence component was spun off and merged with Wegmann & Co to become Krauss-Maffei Wegmann (KMW). Co-operation between companies was already well established, with Wegmann supplying tank turrets, among other things.

After acquisition of Mannesmann's telecommunication business by Vodafone in February 2000, Mannesmann group was dissolved. 

KraussMaffei's locomotive production and defense division Krauss-Maffei Wegmann were bought by Siemens AG.  

In 2000 Krauss-Maffei Kunststofftechnik GmbH took over the KrausMaffei trademarks following dissolution of Mannesmann Group.

In 2016, KraussMaffei (by then only a plastics manufacturer) was purchased by ChemChina.

In November 2018 KraussMaffei was the victim of a ransomware attack, leading to severe drawdown in the production. After the transaction, ChemChina held a good 60 percent of the shares, another Chinese sovereign wealth fund around 15 percent, and the rest was free float. At the same time, production in China was stepped up: In addition, the ChemChina majority holding Qingdao Tianhua Institute of Chemistry Engineering (THY) took over a ChemChina plant in Sanming, which builds injection molding machines for the Chinese market.

Starting in 2022, the company will relocate its headquarters and location in Allach in phases to an industrial estate currently under construction in the community of Vaterstetten, which is located north of the village of Parsdorf.

KraussMaffei will cut 510 jobs worldwide by 2023, most of them in Germany, as the company reported in early 2020.

References

External links
 

ChemChina
Manufacturing companies established in 1930
1999 mergers and acquisitions
2016 mergers and acquisitions
German companies established in 1930
German subsidiaries of foreign companies
Manufacturing companies based in Munich
Industrial machine manufacturers